Tritia corniculum, common name the horn nassa, is a species of sea snail, a marine gastropod mollusk in the family Nassariidae, the Nassa mud snails or dog whelks.

Spelling
Originally introduced in the binomen Buccinum corniculum, the specific epithet is to be considered a noun (meaning "a small horn on a soldier's helmet") and is invariant.

Description
The ovate, conical shell is thick, smooth, and pointed at its summit. The spire is composed of six or seven slightly distinct whorls. The suture is moderately deep. There are a few transverse striae at the base of the body whorl. The aperture is pretty large, ovate, violet-colored or chestnut, and dilated towards the middle. The outer lip is sharp and denticulated within. The left lip is thick and partially covers the columella in its whole extent. The epidermis is thin, of a greenish- or reddish-brown, and beneath are perceived transverse zones, with spots of a slate- or violet-gray color, along with a decurrent white band, articulated with brown or bay-colored spots upon the suture.

Distribution
This species occurs in the Mediterranean Sea and in the Atlantic Ocean off West Africa and the Azores.
<div align=center>

Tritia corniculum var. minor 

</div align=center>

References

 Cernohorsky W. O. (1984). Systematics of the family Nassariidae (Mollusca: Gastropoda). Bulletin of the Auckland Institute and Museum 14: 1–356
 Gofas, S.; Le Renard, J.; Bouchet, P. (2001). Mollusca, in: Costello, M.J. et al. (Ed.) (2001). European register of marine species: a check-list of the marine species in Europe and a bibliography of guides to their identification. Collection Patrimoines Naturels, 50: pp. 180–213

External links
 

corniculum
Gastropods described in 1792